In finance and law, issued shares are the shares of a corporation which have been allocated (allotted) and are subsequently held by shareholders. The act of creating new issued shares is called issuance.  Allotment is simply the transfer of shares to a subscriber. After allotment, a subscriber becomes a shareholder, though usually that also requires formal entry in a share registry.

Overview 
The number of shares that can be issued is limited to the total authorized shares. Issued shares are those shares which the board of directors and/or shareholders have agreed to issue, and which have been issued. Issued shares are the sum of outstanding shares held by shareholders; and treasury shares are shares which had been issued but have been repurchased by the corporation, and which generally have no voting rights or rights to dividends.

The issued shares of a corporation form the equity capital of the corporation, and some corporations are required by law to have a minimum value of equity capital, while others may not need any or just a nominal number. The value of the issued shares is determined at the time they are issued and the value does not change, in relation to the issuing corporation after that time.

Shares are most commonly issued fully paid, in which case the liability of the shareholders is limited to the amount paid on the shares; but they may also be issued partly paid, with unlimited liability, subject to guarantee, or some other form.

Basic formulae

See also
Share capital
Shares outstanding
Treasury shares

References

External links
Detailed break down from Companies House

Corporate law
Corporate finance
Stock market

he:הון מניות#הון מונפק